Bright Akwo Arrey-Mbi  (born 26 March 2003) is a German professional footballer who plays as a defender for 2. Bundesliga club Hannover 96, on loan from Bayern Munich.

Early life
Arrey-Mbi moved to England at age 11. He was educated at St Thomas More School in Bedford, England.

Club career
Bright Arrey-Mbi made his professional debut for Bayern Munich II on 19 September 2020 in a 3. Liga game against Türkgücü München. Later he made his Champions League debut for Bayern Munich senior team on 1 December 2020 against Atlético Madrid.

On 30 January 2022 German sports magazine Kicker reported that Arrey-Mbi would join Bundesliga club 1. FC Köln, on loan for 18 months until 30 June 2023. After he did not feature in any first-team matches while at the club, Bayern Munich decided to terminate the loan agreement with Köln in August 2022, he was then loaned out to 2. Bundesliga club Hannover 96 on a deal until June 2023.

International career
Born in Cameroon, Arrey-Mbi grew up in England and Germany. He moved to England at a young age and represented the England U15s eight times, before switching back to represent Germany internationally. He remains eligible to play for England, Germany or Cameroon internationally.

References

External links

2003 births
Living people
People from Kaarst
Sportspeople from Düsseldorf (region)
Association football defenders
German footballers
Germany youth international footballers
English footballers
England youth international footballers
German people of Cameroonian descent
English people of Cameroonian descent
German sportspeople of African descent
Cameroonian emigrants to Germany
Cameroonian emigrants to England
Naturalized citizens of Germany
Naturalised citizens of the United Kingdom
German emigrants to England
English emigrants to Germany
FC Bayern Munich II players
Footballers from North Rhine-Westphalia
1. FC Köln players
1. FC Köln II players
Hannover 96 players